Nelukulam or Nelukkulam or Nellukkulam (official designation 218), (Tamil: நெளுக்குளம், romanized: Neḷukkuḷam; Sinhala: නෙළුකුලම්, romanized: neḷukulam) is a suburb of Vavuniya in northern Sri Lanka. Nelukkulam is located 5.1 km (3.17 mi) away from the centre of Vavuniya.

Etymology 
Nelu means lotus in Sinhala and the village is also known as Nelukkulam based on the lotus pond there.

Location 
Nelukkulam is located 1 km (0.62 mi) away from Vanuniya. It is bordered to the north by Poovarasankulam, to the east by Vannansinnakkulam, to the west by Kurukkal Puthukkulam, and to the south by Cheddikulam.

References

Education 
Nelukkulam Kalaimagal Maha Vidyalayam

Populated places in Vavuniya District